This is a list of famous French people of British descent. 
 Laura Cox
 Lou Doillon
 Henry Farman
 Charlotte Gainsbourg
 Antoine Hamilton
 Jeanne Moreau
 George Onslow
 Andrew Michael Ramsay
 Erik Satie
 Samia Smith
 Charles Waddington (philosopher)
 Richard Waddington
 William Henry Waddington
 Kenneth White (poet)
 Charles Frederick Worth

See also
 France – United Kingdom relations

British
French, List of British
List
British